The 1981-82 NBA season was the Knicks' 36th season in the NBA. The team finished second-to-last in the Eastern Conference with a 33–49 record.

Draft picks

Roster

Regular season
After falling short in the 1981 NBA Playoffs, the Knicks' general manager Eddie Donovan attempted to add some veteran talent with the intention of making a more playoff-ready team. But Donovan's decisions showed he was out of touch with his team, and most importantly, his star player Michael Ray Richardson. First Ray Williams, Richardson's terrific backcourt teammate, was headed to free agency and therefore traded for veteran Maurice Lucas. Another one of Richardson's friends, Mike Glenn was also sent away, rather than being re-signed for a second-round draft pick.

The Knicks were still in a playoff hunt; despite not playing at a high level, they were 19–17 and were ready to make a run for the playoffs, when Donovan signed Paul Westphal; instead, the Knicks lost 16 of the last 21 games and were left out of the playoffs. It was here when Richardson asked what was wrong with the Knicks, he replied "The Ship Be Sinking". After the Season, Holtzman stepped down as Knicks head coach, and Richardson would be shift off to the Golden State Warriors.

Season standings

z - clinched division title
y - clinched division title
x - clinched playoff spot

Record vs. opponents

Game log

Regular season

|- align="center" bgcolor="#ccffcc"
| 1
| October 30
| @ New Jersey
| W 103–99
|
|
|
| Brendan Byrne Arena
| 1–0
|- align="center" bgcolor="#ffcccc"
| 2

|- align="center" bgcolor="#ffcccc"
| 3
|- align="center" bgcolor="#ccffcc"
| 4
|- align="center" bgcolor="#ffcccc"
| 5
|- align="center" bgcolor="#ccffcc"
| 6
| November 10
| New Jersey
| W 111–99
|
|
|
| Madison Square Garden
| 3–3
|- align="center" bgcolor="#ffcccc"
| 7
|- align="center" bgcolor="#ffcccc"
| 8
| November 14
| Philadelphia
|- align="center" bgcolor="#ffcccc"
| 9
|- align="center" bgcolor="#ffcccc"
| 10
|- align="center" bgcolor="#ccffcc"
| 11
|- align="center" bgcolor="#ffcccc"
| 12
|- align="center" bgcolor="#ccffcc"
| 13
|- align="center" bgcolor="#ccffcc"
| 14

|- align="center" bgcolor="#ccffcc"
| 15
|- align="center" bgcolor="#ffcccc"
| 16
|- align="center" bgcolor="#ccffcc"
| 17
|- align="center" bgcolor="#ccffcc"
| 18
|- align="center" bgcolor="#ccffcc"
| 19
|- align="center" bgcolor="#ffcccc"
| 20
|- align="center" bgcolor="#ffcccc"
| 21
|- align="center" bgcolor="#ccffcc"
| 22
| December 16
| @ Philadelphia
|- align="center" bgcolor="#ccffcc"
| 23
|- align="center" bgcolor="#ffcccc"
| 24
|- align="center" bgcolor="#ffcccc"
| 25
| December 22
| Philadelphia
|- align="center" bgcolor="#ffcccc"
| 26
| December 23
| @ New Jersey
| L 99–115
|
|
|
| Brendan Byrne Arena
| 12–14
|- align="center" bgcolor="#ffcccc"
| 27
| December 25
| New Jersey
| L 95–96
|
|
|
| Madison Square Garden
| 12–15
|- align="center" bgcolor="#ccffcc"
| 28
|- align="center" bgcolor="#ccffcc"
| 29
|- align="center" bgcolor="#ccffcc"
| 30

|- align="center" bgcolor="#ccffcc"
| 31
|- align="center" bgcolor="#ccffcc"
| 32
|- align="center" bgcolor="#ffcccc"
| 33
|- align="center" bgcolor="#ffcccc"
| 34
|- align="center" bgcolor="#ffcccc"
| 35
|- align="center" bgcolor="#ccffcc"
| 36
|- align="center" bgcolor="#ffcccc"
| 37
|- align="center" bgcolor="#ffcccc"
| 38
|- align="center" bgcolor="#ffcccc"
| 39
|- align="center" bgcolor="#ccffcc"
| 40
|- align="center" bgcolor="#ffcccc"
| 41
|- align="center" bgcolor="#ffcccc"
| 42
|- align="center" bgcolor="#ffcccc"
| 43
|- align="center" bgcolor="#ccffcc"
| 44

|- align="center" bgcolor="#ffcccc"
| 45
|- align="center" bgcolor="#ccffcc"
| 46
| February 3
| @ Los Angeles
| W 98–94
|
|
|
| The Forum
| 21–25
|- align="center" bgcolor="#ccffcc"
| 47
|- align="center" bgcolor="#ffcccc"
| 48
|- align="center" bgcolor="#ffcccc"
| 49
|- align="center" bgcolor="#ccffcc"
| 50
|- align="center" bgcolor="#ffcccc"
| 51
| February 13
| Philadelphia
|- align="center" bgcolor="#ffcccc"
| 52
| February 14
| @ Philadelphia
|- align="center" bgcolor="#ffcccc"
| 53
|- align="center" bgcolor="#ffcccc"
| 54
|- align="center" bgcolor="#ccffcc"
| 55
|- align="center" bgcolor="#ccffcc"
| 56
|- align="center" bgcolor="#ffcccc"
| 57
|- align="center" bgcolor="#ccffcc"
| 58
|- align="center" bgcolor="#ffcccc"
| 59

|- align="center" bgcolor="#ccffcc"
| 60
|- align="center" bgcolor="#ccffcc"
| 61
| March 4
| Los Angeles
| W 129–119 (OT)
|
|
|
| Madison Square Garden
| 28–33
|- align="center" bgcolor="#ffcccc"
| 62
|- align="center" bgcolor="#ffcccc"
| 63
|- align="center" bgcolor="#ccffcc"
| 64
|- align="center" bgcolor="#ffcccc"
| 65
|- align="center" bgcolor="#ffcccc"
| 66
|- align="center" bgcolor="#ffcccc"
| 67
|- align="center" bgcolor="#ffcccc"
| 68
|- align="center" bgcolor="#ccffcc"
| 69
|- align="center" bgcolor="#ffcccc"
| 70
|- align="center" bgcolor="#ffcccc"
| 71
| March 28
| @ New Jersey
| L 106–113
|
|
|
| Brendan Byrne Arena
| 30–41
|- align="center" bgcolor="#ccffcc"
| 72

|- align="center" bgcolor="#ccffcc"
| 73
|- align="center" bgcolor="#ffcccc"
| 74
| April 4
| @ Philadelphia
|- align="center" bgcolor="#ffcccc"
| 75
|- align="center" bgcolor="#ffcccc"
| 76
|- align="center" bgcolor="#ccffcc"
| 77
|- align="center" bgcolor="#ffcccc"
| 78
|- align="center" bgcolor="#ffcccc"
| 79
| April 13
| New Jersey
| L 102–104
|
|
|
| Madison Square Garden
| 33–36
|- align="center" bgcolor="#ffcccc"
| 80
|- align="center" bgcolor="#ffcccc"
| 81
|- align="center" bgcolor="#ffcccc"
| 82

Player statistics

Season

Awards and records

Transactions

References

See also
1981-82 NBA season

New York Knicks seasons
New
New York Knicks
New York Knicks
1980s in Manhattan
Madison Square Garden